Watercolor Painting in a Rainy Day (English title according to Cine21 is A Sketch of a Rainy Day) is the 1989 South Korean debut film by director Kwak Jae-yong. The sequel Watercolor Painting in a Rainy Day 2 was released in 1993.

Plot
The story of Ji-su who life was torn by two women in his life. One of them is his step-sister and the other is a barroom dancer named Kyung-ja.

Cast
Kang Suk-hyoun 
Ok So-ri 
Lee Geung-young 
Shin Seong-il 
Kim In-moon 
Lee Ki-yeol 
Bang Eun-hee 
Kim Young-ok 
Chu Seok-yang 
Han Jeong-ho

External links
 
 Watercolor Painting in a Rainy Day Cine21 (Korean)

South Korean romantic drama films
Films directed by Kwak Jae-yong
1989 films
Incest in film
1980s Korean-language films